Stephanie Mills (born 1957) is an American R&B, soul and gospel singer.

Stephanie Mills may also refer to:
Stephanie Anne Mills (born 1979), Canadian voice actress
Stephanie Mills (All in the Family), a character from 1970s American television situation comedy All in the Family played by Danielle Brisebois
Stephanie Mills (album), 1985
Stephanie Mills (Coronation Street), a 2002 character from British soap Coronation Street played by Rebecca Atkinson

See also
Steve Mills (disambiguation)
Stephanie Miller (born 1961), American political commentator, comedian and host of The Stephanie Miller Show
Stephanie Millward (born 1981), British Paralympic swimmer

Mills, Stephanie